Jose Luis Cuevas (born June 12, 1989) is an American soccer player.

Career
Cuevas played for USL Premier Development League club Fresno Fuego between 2009 and 2011, making 44 appearances and scoring 16 goals.

Cuevas impressed Charleston Battery at the 2011 USL Men's Player Combine and spent most of the 2011 pre-season with the Battery appearing in the Carolina Challenge Cup games. He signed with Charleston on January 6, 2012. Cuevas scored two goals on his professional debut against Richmond Kickers on April 7, 2012. He finished the season with 7 goals and 4 assists and was named USL Pro Rookie of the Year.

After spending the first half of the 2014 season with USL PDL club Fresno Fuego, Cuevas returned to Charleston Battery in July 2014. Cuevas signed a multi-year contract with USL Pro club Arizona United on November 12, 2014.

References

External links
 Charleston Battery player profile

1989 births
Living people
American soccer players
Fresno Fuego players
Charleston Battery players
Phoenix Rising FC players
Fresno FC players
Association football midfielders
Soccer players from California
USL League Two players
People from Farmersville, California
USL Championship players